Mykyta Zhukov (born 19 March 1995) is a professional Ukrainian football midfielder who plays for Nyva Vinnytsia.

Career
Zhukov is a product of the FC Inter Dnipropetrovsk sportive youth school in his native Dnipropetrovsk Oblast. He spent time with different Ukrainian teams in the lower or amateur leagues.

In summer 2016 Zhukov signed a contract with the Ukrainian First League FC Inhulets Petrove and made his debut for the main team squad on 18 September 2016 in a match against FC Ternopil.

From February 2017 he played on loan for FC Zirka Kropyvnytskyi and made his debut in the Ukrainian Premier League for Zirka on 26 February 2017, playing in a match against FC Dnipro.

References

External links
 
 

1995 births
Living people
Ukrainian footballers
People from Kamianske
Association football midfielders
FC Stal Kamianske players
FC Kremin Kremenchuk players
FC Oleksandriya players
FC Inhulets Petrove players
FC Inhulets-2 Petrove players
FC Zirka Kropyvnytskyi players
SC Tavriya Simferopol players
FC Nikopol players
FC Skoruk Tomakivka players
FC Nyva Vinnytsia players
Ukrainian Premier League players
Ukrainian First League players
Ukrainian Second League players
Sportspeople from Dnipropetrovsk Oblast